This article features the 2005 UEFA European Under-19 Championship qualification. 25 teams (12 group winners, 12 group runners-up and the third placed team that performed best against the numbers 1 and 2 of its group) entered the elite qualification.

Byes
The following teams received a bye for this round:

 
 
  (main tournament host)

Group 1

All matches were played in the Faroe Islands.

Group 2

All matches were played in Ukraine. This group brought forth the best third placed team. Moldova performed best against group winners and runners-up Ukraine and Poland, achieving 4 points and a goal difference of +1 (1-0).

Group 3

All matches were played in Slovenia.

Group 4

All matches were played in North Macedonia.

Group 5

All matches were played in Slovakia.

Group 6

All matches were played in Denmark.

Group 7

All matches were played in Israel.

Group 8

All matches were played in Belgium.

Group 9

All matches were played in Cyprus.

Group 10

All matches were played in one country.

Group 11

All matches were played in Italy.

Group 12

All matches were played in Norway.

See also
 2005 UEFA European Under-19 Championship elite qualification
 2005 UEFA European Under-19 Championship

External links
Results by RSSSF

Qual
UEFA European Under-19 Championship qualification